ArtWorks is an advanced vector drawing package for RISC OS created by Computer Concepts (now Xara) in 1991.  It has been developed by MW Software since 1996. Xara has continued to develop a Windows version called Xara Photo & Graphic Designer.

Release History

References

External links 
 
 Xara

RISC OS software